Millennium Bureau of Canada was a small, temporary agency of the Government of Canada, to celebrate the "millennium" during the year 2000.

The Weather Network and MétéoMédia served as partners with the agency, as the official promoters of related activities across Canada.

The 665 projects carried out by the Millennium Bureau include:
 Tall Ships in Halifax, Nova Scotia
 Relay 2000 of the Trans Canada Trail in Hull, Quebec on September 9, 2000
 Literacy Builders
 Canada Remembers 2000
 Pacific Grace Replica Schooner
 Meewasin Valley Trail System
 Canada Dance Festival
 Fisheries Museum of the Atlantic Millennium Exhibit
 The Islendingur: A Timeless Adventure in L'Anse aux Meadows, Newfoundland

The CMPP received more than 10,000 applications representing more than $1.9 billion in financial assistance for millennium projects. Since it was launched in 1998, the CMPP approved 1,745 projects representing just over $149 million in funding.

Turn of the third millennium